The Col. Thomas Wentworth Higginson House is a historic house in Cambridge, Massachusetts. It is named after author, minister, and abolitionist Thomas Wentworth Higginson, who had it built and lived there for a time.

The house was built in 1880 and added to the National Register of Historic Places in 1982. It was the first home that Higginson ever owned. As he wrote to his sister shortly after moving in, "It is such inexpressible happiness to have at last a permanent home."

See also
National Register of Historic Places listings in Cambridge, Massachusetts

References

Houses completed in 1880
Houses on the National Register of Historic Places in Cambridge, Massachusetts
Queen Anne architecture in Massachusetts